Men Can't Be Raped is a 1978 Finnish-Swedish drama film directed by Jörn Donner, based on the novel Manrape by Märta Tikkanen.

External links

1978 films
1978 drama films
Films directed by Jörn Donner
Finnish drama films
Swedish drama films
1970s Swedish-language films
Films based on Finnish novels
Rape and revenge films
1970s Swedish films